During the 2002–03 English football season, Sheffield United competed in the Football League First Division.

Season summary
The season turned out to be one of the most successful in Sheffield United's history. United reached the semi-finals of both the FA and League Cups before being eliminated by Arsenal and Liverpool respectively; both sides went on to win the respective cups. United also managed to qualify for the play-offs for promotion to the Premiership. United reached the play-off final after beating Nottingham Forest over two legs in the semi-final, but were beaten by Wolverhampton Wanderers.

Final league table

Results
Sheffield United's score comes first

Legend

First Division play-offs

FA Cup

League Cup

Players

First-team squad

Left club during season

References

Notes

Sheffield United
Sheffield United F.C. seasons